Live at Third Man Records West is a live EP by the alternative rock band The Dead Weather.

Track listing

The Dead Weather EPs
2009 live albums
2009 EPs
Live EPs
Reprise Records live albums
Reprise Records EPs
Third Man Records EPs